Nasrin (born 13 May 1978) is a retired Bangladeshi film actress who mainly played supporting roles. She made her debut in Sohanur Rahman Sohan's film Love in 1992. The same year, her film Agnishapath was also released.  In 2019, It's been announced that her biopic will be made to honor her career and achievement.

Career 
Nasreen made her debut in 1992 film Love, followed by Agnishapath. She was often seen playing girl-next-door, vamp, heroine's best friend and comedian. She was popularly paired up with actor Dildar. They appeared in many successful films as a comic team. After Dildar's death, she started appraring alongdide Kabila and Afzal Sharif as a comic actress and their love interests.

Personal life
Nasreen married businessman Mustafizur Rahman Riyel in 2012. Together they have a son and a daughter. After marriage, she retired from acting permanently.

Selected filmography

References

Living people
Bangladeshi film actresses
Bangladeshi female models
20th-century Bangladeshi actresses
21st-century Bangladeshi actresses
1978 births